Harptree is a hamlet in Saskatchewan. The community was named by William Halwell, the first settler, after his original home, The Harptrees (East Harptree/West Harptree) in Somerset, England.

References

Bengough No. 40, Saskatchewan
Unincorporated communities in Saskatchewan
Division No. 2, Saskatchewan